Cassilis is a village in the central west of New South Wales, Australia.

Its population in the 2016 census was 304. 88.6% of people were born in Australia. The most common response for religion was Anglican at 45.8%.

It was formerly known as Dalkeith.

References

External links

Suburbs of Upper Hunter Shire
Towns in the Hunter Region